Jermaine Dontay Thomas (born January 12, 1984) is an American professional basketball player for Cuore Napoli Basket. He played basketball for Governor Thomas Johnson High School in Frederick, Maryland and La Salle University in Philadelphia. Thomas has played in several countries, including for Spanish team Bàsquet Manresa in Liga ACB. In 2019, Thomas was charged and sentenced to 3 years in jail with sex abuse at the Jefferson School in Frederick, Maryland

References

1984 births
Living people
African-American basketball players
American expatriate basketball people in Austria
American expatriate basketball people in Germany
American expatriate basketball people in Hungary
American expatriate basketball people in Montenegro
American expatriate basketball people in Spain
American men's basketball players
Bàsquet Manresa players
BC Körmend players
Eisbären Bremerhaven players
Hungarian men's basketball players
KK Sutjeska players
La Salle Explorers men's basketball players
Liga ACB players
Point guards
Soproni KC players
Sportspeople from Frederick, Maryland
21st-century African-American sportspeople
20th-century African-American people